Tamaqua Area School District is a public school district in Schuylkill County, Pennsylvania. It serves the borough of Tamaqua and its surrounding townships of Rush Township, Walker Township, Schuylkill Township, and West Penn Township. The district encompasses approximately 123 square miles. 

As of 2021-22, the school district serves 2,008 students and employs 135 full-time teachers for a student-teacher ratio of 15.47.

Tamaqua Area School District operates three elementary schools (Rush Elementary School, Tamaqua Elementary School, and West Penn Elementary School), one middle school (Tamaqua Area Middle School), and one high school (Tamaqua Area High School).

Extracurriculars
Tamaqua Area School District offers an extensive variety of clubs, activities and sports. In 2012, the school board cut golf, tennis and cheerleading due to budget constraints caused by the escalating teacher pension funding mandates.

In June 2013, the District agreed to permitting the Tamaqua Area Girls' Youth Softball Association to build a softball field at Rush Elementary School. The club received a $11,975 grant from Baseball Tomorrow Fund to fund the project.

Music and the arts
Tamaqua Area High School has a continually growing arts programs. The Raider Marching Band has over 200 participating students as of the 2019–2020 school year. Those in marching band, besides those who do not play instruments, must also participate in the concert band. Every year, Tamaqua is able to send students to the Schuylkill County Band festival, and students also have the opportunity to audition for the PMEA District 10 Band Festival, in which they can advance to Region V Band and/or PMEA All-State Band. Many students in Tamaqua's history have represented the school at these festivals. Students in concert band may also choose to participate in jazz band.

Tamaqua Area High School also has a chorus program that has been in existence for nearly 30 years. Students may participate in concert choir and/or jazz chorale, and students that wish to participate in jazz chorale must audition for it. Any student in jazz chorale is eligible to audition for the Schuylkill County Chorus festival, and Tamaqua has always been represented well at these festivals. Jazz chorale participants may also audition for the PMEA District 10 Chorus Festival, in which they can move on to Region V Chorus and/or PMEA All-State Chorus. There have also been many students that have represented Tamaqua at these festivals. As of the 2019–2020 school year, the concert choir has nearly 50 participants, and jazz chorale around the same.

Tamaqua Area High School even has a rapidly-growing drama club, which has consistently had over 80 cast and crew members.

Sports

Boys
Baseball - AAA
Basketball - AAA
Cross country	- AA
Football (varsity & junior varsity) - AA
Golf	 - AA
Soccer - AA
Swimming and diving - AA
Tennis - AA
Track and field - AAA
Wrestling	 - AA

Girls
Basketball - AA
Cross country	 - AA
Golf	- AA
Soccer (fall) - AA
Softball - AA
Swimming and diving - AA
Girls' tennis - AA
Track and field - AA
Volleyball - AA

Middle school

Boys
Basketball
Cross country	
Football (7th & 9th grade)
Track and field
Wrestling	

Girls
Basketball
Cross country	
Track and field

According to PIAA directory July 2012

References

External links
 Official website
 Schuylkill Technology Center
 IU29 Schuylkill Intermediate Unit

School districts in Schuylkill County, Pennsylvania